Prole  is an unincorporated rural village in northwestern Warren County, Iowa, United States.  It lies along Iowa Highway 28 northwest of the city of Indianola, the county seat of Warren County.  Its elevation is 978 feet (298 m).  Prole has a post office, with the ZIP code of 50229, a cafe, a floral shop and an auto repair shop by way of businesses and services.

History
Prole was laid out in 1884. The post office has been in operation in Prole since 25 September 1884. 

Prole's population was 21 in 1902, and 55 in 1925.

References

Unincorporated communities in Warren County, Iowa
Populated places established in 1884
Unincorporated communities in Iowa
1884 establishments in Iowa